The Orșova is a left tributary of the river Gurghiu in Romania. It flows into the Gurghiu near the village Gurghiu.

References

Rivers of Romania
Rivers of Mureș County